Hamadi Al Ghaddioui (born 22 September 1990) is a German professional footballer who plays as a forward for  club SV Sandhausen.

Club career
Al Ghaddioui previously played for SC Verl, the second team of Borussia Dortmund and Sportfreunde Lotte before joining Jahn Regensburg in the 2018 winter transfer window.

In the summer of 2019, Al Ghaddioui moved to VfB Stuttgart.

On 14 January 2022, Pafos announced the signing of Al Ghaddioui for an undisclosed fee from VfB Stuttgart. On 25 January 2023, Pafos announced that Al Ghaddioui was leaving the club to join an unnamed 2. Bundesliga club.

On 26 January 2023, Al Ghaddioui signed with SV Sandhausen.

Personal life
Born in Germany, Al Ghaddioui is of Moroccan descent.

Career statistics

References

External links
 

1990 births
Living people
German people of Moroccan descent
Sportspeople from Bonn
German footballers
Footballers from North Rhine-Westphalia
Association football forwards
Bayer 04 Leverkusen II players
SC Verl players
Borussia Dortmund II players
Sportfreunde Lotte players
SSV Jahn Regensburg players
VfB Stuttgart players
Pafos FC players
SV Sandhausen players
Bundesliga players
2. Bundesliga players
3. Liga players
Regionalliga players
Cypriot First Division players
German expatriate footballers
German expatriate sportspeople in Cyprus
Expatriate footballers in Cyprus